Attheya arenicola is a diatom in the genus Attheya. Type material was collected from intertidal sand in Penbre, South Wales.

References

External links
INA card for Attheya arenicola

Protists described in 1994
Ochrophyte species
Coscinodiscophyceae